Palmophyllum is a genus of alga. This genus is known to grow in low light conditions and at depth. The known distribution of this genus is being extended as deeper waters are explored.

Palmophyllum consists of spherical cells in a gelatinous matrix, and grows on substrates such as corals and rocks.

Species

 Palmophyllum crassum (Naccari 1828) Rabenhorst 1868
 Palmophyllum foliaceum West 1907
 Palmophyllum umbracola Nelson & Ryan 1986

References

External links
 AlgaeBase

Chlorophyta genera
Palmophyllophyceae